Mohammad Reza Rezaei Kouchi is an Iranian politician who represents Jahrom and Khafr in the Islamic Consultative Assembly since 2008. He is the head of the civil commission of the parliament.

Electoral history

References

1971 births
Living people
People from Jahrom
Members of the 8th Islamic Consultative Assembly
Members of the 9th Islamic Consultative Assembly
Members of the 10th Islamic Consultative Assembly
Members of the 11th Islamic Consultative Assembly
Shiraz University alumni